The Minister of Foreign Affairs of the People's Republic of China is the head of the Ministry of Foreign Affairs of the People's Republic of China and one of the country's top and most important cabinet posts. The Minister usually is also a member of the Central Committee of the Chinese Communist Party and a state councillor. The Minister is the second-highest ranking diplomat in China after the director of the Office of the Central Foreign Affairs Commission.

Process of appointment 
According to the Constitution of the People's Republic of China, the Minister is nominated by the Premier  and confirmed by the National People's Congress or its Standing Committee.

List of officeholders

References

External links 
 Official English website of the PRC Ministry of Foreign Affairs

 
China